Events from the year 1611 in Ireland.

Incumbent
Monarch: James I

Events
February 18 – Sir Humphrey Winch, retiring Lord Chief Justice of Ireland, is sent to London with draft legislation.
May 7 – surrender and regrant in Counties Carlow, Wexford and Wicklow is authorised.
June – Roman Catholic priest Patrick O'Loughran returns from exile.
July 11 – October 21: Lord Carew is in Ireland (as authorised in June) to inquire into its government and report on prospects for the plantation of Ulster (August).
August 19 – the Church of Ireland Bishop of Elphin, John Lynch, resigns, declaring himself a Roman Catholic, and is succeeded by Edward King (consecrated December).
November 25 – the nobility and gentry claim the right to have advance sight of bills intended for the Parliament of Ireland.
Giolla Brighde Ó hEoghusa (Bonaventura Ó hEoghusa or O'Hussey)'s An Teagasc Criosdaidhe is published in Antwerp, the first devotional work in Irish.

Births
Richard Lynch, Jesuit theologian (d. 1676)
Hugh Dubh O'Neill, 5th Earl of Tyrone, soldier (d. 1660) (born in Brussels)

Deaths

References

 
1610s in Ireland
Ireland
Years of the 17th century in Ireland